Trung Hòa may refer to several places in Vietnam, including:

Trung Hòa, Cầu Giấy, a ward of Cầu Giấy District in Hanoi
Trung Hòa, Chương Mỹ, a commune of Chương Mỹ District in Hanoi
Trung Hòa, Bắc Kạn, a commune of Ngân Sơn District
Trung Hòa, Đồng Nai, a commune of Trảng Bom District
Trung Hòa, Hòa Bình, a commune of Tân Lạc District
Trung Hòa, Hưng Yên, a commune of Yên Mỹ District
Trung Hòa, Tiền Giang, a commune of Chợ Gạo District
Trung Hòa, Tuyên Quang, a commune of Chiêm Hóa District

See also
Trung Hoà–Nhân Chính, a borough in southwestern Hanoi
Trung Hóa, a commune of Minh Hóa District in Quảng Bình Province